The 1994 season was  the San Francisco 49ers' 45th in the National Football League (NFL), the 49th overall and their sixth under head coach  George Seifert.  This season was highlighted by a victory in Super Bowl XXIX. The championship made San Francisco the first team to win five Super Bowls. After losing to the Dallas Cowboys in the previous two conference championship games, the 49ers made significant acquisitions in the 1994 free agent market. This included the signing of two-sport star Deion Sanders and Cowboys linebacker Ken Norton, Jr. Sanders had a major impact on the team's success, winning the NFL Defensive Player of the Year Award and recording six interceptions. The 49ers won their division, the NFC West, for the eighth time in nine seasons.

Quarterback Steve Young had his best NFL season and won his second MVP award. Young set what was, at the time, the NFL record for highest passer rating in a season – 112.8. Cold Hard Football Facts states that Young's 1994 season is the second greatest passing season in NFL history, behind only Joe Montana's 1989 season.

For the third consecutive season, the 49ers met the Cowboys in the NFC Championship Game. From the mid-1980s until the latter 1990s, the AFC was widely regarded as the NFL's weaker conference. At the time of this conference championship game, AFC teams had lost the previous 10 Super Bowls in a row, starting with Super Bowl XIX after the 1984 season. All but two of those losses were by at least 10 points; five of them were by more than 20 points. As a result, the NFC Championship meeting between the Niners and Cowboys was dubbed by many as "the real Super Bowl." The contest was one of the highest rated non-Super Bowl games in NFL history.

The 49ers beat the Cowboys and went on to defeat the San Diego Chargers in Super Bowl XXIX. Young was named the game's MVP after throwing a record six touchdown passes.

The 1994 49ers ranked #19 on the 100 greatest teams of all time presented by the NFL on its 100th anniversary.
As of the 2022 NFL season, this is the last Super Bowl the 49ers have won.

Offseason

NFL Draft

Training Camp
The 1994 San Francisco 49ers season held training camp at Sierra College in Rocklin, California.

Personnel

Staff

Roster

Pre season

Schedule

Game officials

Regular season
In 1994, after the retirements and departures of several stalwarts from the late 1980s and early 1990s teams, the 49ers spent large amounts of money on the addition of several star free agent veterans. The revamp focused mainly on defense, where six new starters including Ken Norton, Jr., Gary Plummer, Rickey Jackson, and Deion Sanders were implemented, all with the ultimate goal in mind of dethroning the Dallas Cowboys. Said safety Merton Hanks, "Those players came in on one and two-year deals and they understood, 'if we do not get it done this year this organization is going to blow itself up.'" Additionally, several rookie players made key contributions to the team, some becoming season-long starters. This included defensive tackle Bryant Young, fullback William Floyd, and linebacker Lee Woodall. The 49ers started slowly early in the season.  They defeated the Raiders in a game where Jerry Rice broke the NFL record for career touchdowns, but followed with a 24–17 loss to the Kansas City Chiefs, led by former 49ers quarterback Joe Montana.

Despite victories over the Rams and Saints, the 49ers offensive line was struggling, having lost four starters to injury, and in Week 5 the Niners were crushed 40–8 by the Eagles.  Following the Eagles game, a poll conducted on local sports radio station KNBR showed that an overwhelming majority of 49er fans wanted head coach George Seifert fired.

The game against the Eagles was a turning point for the 49ers despite being a lopsided loss. Steve Young was benched for Elvis Grbac abruptly during a series in the 3rd quarter. Soon after, Young was livid on the sidelines, shouting profanities at head coach George Seifert. Young later admitted "I was looking for a fistfight," and would later say that this incident caused his teammates to respond better to his leadership, as they saw how much he cared about winning ("It galvanized the guys behind Steve," said Brent Jones).

The following week in Detroit, the 49ers trailed the Lions 7–0. After throwing a pass, Young was hit, picked up, and driven into the ground by three Lions defenders. After the hit, Young was screaming with his face dark red in color. He crawled most of the way off of the field before refusing help from the trainers as he limped the remaining way off the field. He miraculously returned to the field two plays later (NFL rules state that after trainers attend to an injured player, that player must leave the field for at least one play – Elvis Grbac came in for that one play and threw an incompletion) to lead the 49ers to a 27–21 victory.

The team rallied around Young to win 10 straight games, including a 21–14 victory over the two-time defending Super Bowl champion Cowboys. During that span, the 49ers' average margin of victory was nearly 20 points per game; they broke 35 points scored seven times, four times breaking 40 points scored.

Throwback uniforms 
During the 1994 season, many NFL teams wore "throwback uniforms" for occasional games (after week 2 of the season) to celebrate the NFL's 75th anniversary (a corresponding diamond 75th Anniversary patch was also worn by all teams). The 49ers chose to wear a version of their 1955 uniforms as throwbacks. This design featured sans-serif block numerals that were outlined and shadowed in black. White pants with thinner red-black-red striping were also worn, along with the old striped red socks (the team later reverted to their regular solid red socks after receiving permission from the NFL to wear the uniforms starting from Week 10 until Super Bowl XXIX). The team's regular 1989–95 gold helmet was worn with this uniform, as there was no logo on the 1955 helmet.

The team first donned the 1955 throwback uniforms during a week 3 match against the Los Angeles Rams and the following week at home versus the Saints. Both games ended in victory (coincidentally, these were also the first two games Deion Sanders played with the 49ers after signing as a free-agent after week 2). The team then suffered an embarrassing 40–8 loss to the Philadelphia Eagles at home wearing their regular red uniforms with gold pants. (Football statistics site Football Outsiders calculates this 49ers loss to be the second-most lopsided football game they'd tracked from 1994 to 2008.)

For the subsequent three games until their bye week, the team again was scheduled to play games wearing the throwback uniforms with white pants and blockshadow numerals, and all three games resulted in wins. During the following weeks the 49ers embarked on a 10-game winning streak. The team, prompted both by the superstition of coach George Seifert, and the preference of players, petitioned the NFL to wear the throwback uniforms for the rest of the season. The league granted the request and the switch to solid red socks after the bye week marked this occurrence. In all, the team went 15–1 (including the playoffs) wearing the 1955/1994 throwback uniforms. The only loss occurred during the regular season finale at Minnesota, with the team wearing white jerseys and resting most of their starters for the playoffs. Meanwhile, the 49ers went undefeated wearing the red jerseys of the throwback uniform. After winning Super Bowl XXIX however, the team was compelled to revert to wearing its regular 1964-style uniforms (1991 revised design) for the following 1995 season. One year later, the throwback design strongly influenced the 49ers to redesign their uniform set. In 1996, the team revealed a new helmet and uniform design featuring a darker red, shadowed numbers, black accents, and white pants. In 1998, the team changed the pants to a gold color and wore these uniforms through the 2008 season. The 49ers brought back the 1994 white throwback uniform design as an alternate set for the 2018 season. The 1994 red throwback jerseys were brought back by the team as an alternate uniform for the 2021 season, the 49ers franchise's 75th anniversary.

Schedule

Game summaries

Week 1 vs. Los Angeles Raiders

The Niners led wire to wire as Steve Young opened with two touchdowns.  Jerry Rice’s 69-yard score set an NFL record for career touchdowns.

Week 2 at Kansas City Chiefs

This was the much-hyped match between Steve Young and Joe Montana, Young's predecessor as the 49ers' quarterback.  Montana threw two touchdowns and a two-point conversion.  Young clawed the Niners to a 14–7 lead but was then sacked for a safety; the Niners also fumbled twice while Young threw two picks.  San Francisco sports bars airing the game saw viewers overwhelmingly cheer for Montana's Chiefs over Young and the Niners.

Week 3 at Los Angeles Rams

This became the final game between the 49ers and Rams in Los Angeles until 2016.

Week 4 vs. New Orleans Saints

Week 5 vs. Philadelphia Eagles

Steve Young was benched after going 11 of 23 with two interceptions and getting sacked for a safety by William Fuller; Elvis Grbac completed four of eight passes and was sacked twice.  The Eagles outgained the Niners in yardage 437 to 189. This was the second worst loss by an eventual Super Bowl champion in NFL history.

Week 6 at Detroit Lions

The Lions jumped to a 14–0 lead on a Brett Perriman touchdown catch and a nine-yard score from Barry Sanders.  Young was knocked out for one play with a pinched nerve in his leg; he came back in despite heavy pain and rallied the Niners to 27 unanswered points.

Week 7 at Atlanta Falcons

Ex-Falcon Deion Sanders returned to the Georgia Dome and ran back a 93-yard interception for a touchdown.  Steve Young threw four touchdowns while Jeff George threw four interceptions; it was the second six-turnover game for the Falcons that season.

Week 8 vs. Tampa Bay Buccaneers

Facing the team with which he entered the NFL, Steve Young completed twenty passes for 255 yards and one score. Ricky Watters and William Floyd rushed for a combined three more touchdowns.  In contrast Trent Dilfer completed just seven passes and was benched.

Week 9: Bye 

The 1994 San Francisco 49ers season had a bye week, as did all of the NFC West. The team was granted permission from the NFL to wear throwback uniforms for the remainder of the season.

Week 10 at Washington Redskins

Week 11 vs. Dallas Cowboys

The 49ers posted their first win over the Cowboys since 1990.  The game was tied 7–7 until the Niners scored in the final three minutes of the third quarter on a 57-yard Jerry Rice touchdown catch.  Following an exchange of four consecutive punts, Troy Aikman was intercepted by Merton Hanks; the ensuing Niners drive took fifteen plays and ended on a Brent Jones touchdown catch just before the two-minute warning.  A very late Cowboys touchdown was followed by an unsuccessful onside kick and Niners win.

Week 12 vs. Los Angeles Rams

In their last home meeting with the Rams as a Los Angeles team until 2016, the Niners blew a 21–6 lead and trailed 27–24; Jerry Rice fumbled with 6:05 to go but the Rams had to punt.  Steve Young threw on seven of the next ten plays and connected with Rice for the go-ahead score with 1:56 to go; the Rams failed on 4th and 20 and the Niners were winners.

Week 13 at New Orleans Saints

Week 14 vs. Atlanta Falcons

Week 15 at San Diego Chargers

In the preview to Super Bowl XXIX, Steve Young threw two touchdown passes and Deion Sanders recorded a pick six as the 49ers never trailed.

Week 16 vs. Denver Broncos

Week 17 at Minnesota Vikings

Having secured the first playoff seed, the Niners started Steve Young and he completed all but one of thirteen passes before giving way to Elvis Grbac.  Ricky Watters fumbled on San Francisco's second drive and the Vikings scored.  Needing the game for the NFC Central division title, the Vikings won 21–14.

Game officials

Standings

Playoffs

Notes:

 All times in Pacific Time Zone.

NFC Divisional Playoff

After a Brent Jones fumble on their first drive of the game, in which the Bears converted with a field goal by Kevin Butler, the 49ers went on to score 37 unanswered points to rout the Bears 44–15, including scoring 23 in the second quarter (Jones caught an eight-yard score in the second). The Bears would not score until the fourth quarter when the game was already out of reach. An endzone brawl erupted late in the second quarter following Steve Young's six-yard rushing score.   Shaun Gayle of the Bears pushed Young to the dirt after the score; when Young threw the ball in the ground and in Gayle's face, a fight erupted.

NFC Championship Game

Looking to make a statement after being knocked out of the playoffs the previous two years by the Cowboys, the 49ers pounced on turnovers by the Cowboys on their first three possessions to start the game; San Francisco thus broke out to a 21–0 lead midway through the first quarter. It started with an interception by Eric Davis that was returned 44 yards for a touchdown on just the third play of the game; it was followed by a Michael Irvin fumble that set up a 29-yard screen pass by Steve Young to Ricky Watters for a touchdown, and then a fumble on the ensuing kickoff in which the 49ers converted with a one-yard touchdown run by William Floyd. The 49ers went into halftime up 31–14 after a 28-yard pass by Young to Jerry Rice. The Cowboys fought back in the 2nd half, but fell short and the 49ers won 38–28, advancing to their 5th Super Bowl. The Cowboys turned the ball over 5 times, which ended up being a major factor in the game. The 49ers also handed Troy Aikman his first ever loss as a starting quarterback in the post season.  Young's victory came ironically with almost the same passer rating (84.7) he'd had in his 1992 championship loss to Dallas (84.6).

Super Bowl XXIX

Steve Young set a Super Bowl record by throwing six touchdown passes in a game. The record had previously been held by his predecessor Joe Montana, who threw for a then-record five touchdowns in Super Bowl XXIV (ironically against one of San Diego's AFC West rivals).

(*)The Chargers became the first team to have a successful two-point conversion in the Super Bowl. This was the first season in which the NFL allowed 2-point conversions (a rule in place in the American Football League in San Diego's first ten seasons), and the Chargers actually had two in the game.

Game officials

Media

Pre season Local TV

Local Radio

1995 AFC-NFC Pro Bowl

 Merton Hanks, FS, NFC Pro Bowlers
 Brent Jones, TE, NFC Pro Bowlers
 Tim McDonald, SS, NFC Pro Bowlers
 Bart Oates, C, NFC Pro Bowlers
 Jerry Rice, WR, NFC Pro Bowlers
 Deion Sanders, CB, NFC Pro Bowlers
 Jesse Sapolu, G, NFC Pro Bowlers
 Dana Stubblefield, DT, NFC Pro Bowlers
 Ricky Watters, RB, NFC Pro Bowlers
 Steve Young, QB, NFC Pro Bowlers

Awards and honors
 Led NFL with 66 Touchdowns
 Led NFL with 505 points scored
 Jerry Rice, NFL leader, Receiving Yards (1,499)
 Jerry Rice, NFC Pro Bowl
 Deion Sanders, National Football League Defensive Player of the Year Award
 Deion Sanders, Newspaper Enterprise Association Defensive Player of the Year Award
 Deion Sanders, NFC Pro Bowl
 Bryant Young, Defensive End, UPI NFL-NFC Rookie of the Year
 Steve Young, led NFL, 35 Touchdown Passes
 Steve Young, NFL Passing Leader, 112.8 Passer Rating
 Steve Young, NFC Pro Bowl
 Steve Young, All-Pro selection
 Steve Young, Super Bowl XXIX MVP
 Steve Young, NFL MVP 
 Steve Young, PFWA NFL MVP
 Steve Young, NEA NFL MVP
 Steve Young, UPI NFC Player of the Year
 Steve Young, Bert Bell Award

Milestones
 Jerry Rice, 100 reception season (Rice finished the season with 112 receptions)
 Jerry Rice, 1,000-yard receiving season
 Jerry Rice surpassed Jim Brown's all time touchdown record of 126 in week one, scoring three touchdowns against the Los Angeles Raiders on Monday Night Football.

References

External links
 49ers on Pro Football Reference

San Francisco 49ers seasons
San Francisco 49ers
NFC West championship seasons
National Football Conference championship seasons
Super Bowl champion seasons
San
1994 in San Francisco